Lux Æterna ("eternal light") is an orchestral composition by Clint Mansell. Performed by the Kronos Quartet, it forms a leitmotif in the 2000 film Requiem for a Dream, and is the penultimate piece in the movie's soundtrack.

A re-orchestrated version of the composition, titled "Requiem for a Tower", was created for the trailer of The Lord of the Rings: The Two Towers in 2002.

In popular culture
Both "Lux Aeterna" and the re-orchestrated version, "Requiem for a Tower" that was created for the trailer of The Lord of the Rings: The Two Towers, have been used in multiple forms of media, including the film trailers for The Da Vinci Code, I Am Legend, Sunshine and Babylon A.D.; trailers for the video games Assassin's Creed and Lord of the Rings: Return of the King; advertising campaigns for such products as Canon PowerShot cameras, Molson Canadian and Canadian wireless carrier Telus; and on television such as in the series So You Think You Can Dance as well as a promo spot the series Flash Forward.

Requiem for a Tower

A re-orchestrated version of "Lux Aeterna", titled "Requiem for a Tower", was arranged by composers Simone Benyacar, Dan Nielsen and Veigar Margeirsson for the trailer of The Lord of the Rings: The Two Towers. "Requiem for a Tower" features a choir and full orchestra.
 
Although never intended for release, after considerable demand by fans the re-recording(s) were made available as part of the Requiem for a Tower album release from Corner Stone Cues. While the release was originally made physically, production was discontinued indefinitely with increased digital sales of the album on major electronic music distributors iTunes and Amazon MP3.

Corner Stone Cues release

References

Songs written for films
2000 songs
Compositions by Clint Mansell
Requiem for a Dream